Open casket may refer to:
 Open casket funeral
 Open coffin

See also 
 Viewing (funeral)
 Wake (ceremony)

Other uses
 Open Casket, a 2016 painting by Dana Schutz
 "Open Casket", an episode of the American television series The Haunting of Hill House
 "Open Casket", a song by the death metal band Death from the 1988 album Leprosy